Pleurotomella neerrepenensis is an extinct species of sea snail, a marine gastropod mollusk in the family Raphitomidae.

Description

Distribution
Fossils of this marine species were found in Oligocene strata in Belgium.

References

 Marquet R., Lenaerts J. & Laporte J. (2016). A systematic study of the Gastropoda (Mollusca) of the Grimmertingen Sand Member (early Oligocene) in Belgium. Palaeontos. 29: 1-159

neerrepenensis
Gastropods described in 2016